ISLD may refer to:

 Idaho State Liquor Division, an Idaho state authority controlling alcohol sales
 Inter-Service Liaison Department, a cover name employed by the British Secret Intelligence Service in the Middle East and Asia during World War II